Iino may refer to:

 Iino (surname), a Japanese surname
 Iino Domain, a feudal domain under the Tokugawa shogunate of Edo period Japan
 Iino Castle, a castle in Ebino, Miyazaki Prefecture, Japan
 Mountain Iino, a mountain of Kagawa Prefecture, Japan
 Iino, Fukushima, a former town in Date District, Fukushima Prefecture, Japan